Here is the second album from American singer-actress Idina Menzel. Unable to find acting gigs, Menzel began recording the album in 1999, but was dropped by Hollywood Records after her previous album Still I Can't Be Still didn't sell a lot. In 2004, Menzel self-released Here, despite it being incomplete. While Menzel was performing in Wicked which earned her a big rise to fame, she sold copies of the album at the Gershwin Theatre. The album has sold around 2,000 copies.

To promote the album, Menzel performed a one night only concert at the Zipper Theatre in NYC on December 13, 2004 (on a dark night from Wicked) entitled Idina: For My Friends. Following filming the film version of Rent in 2005, she performed a set of mini concerts in Massachusetts including the Provincetown Theatre, Regetta Bar, and the Hot Tin Roof.

Track listing
 "Here" – 3:39
 "You'd Be Surprised" – 4:31
 "If I Told You" – 4:00
 "Penny" – 4:02
 "Once Upon A Time" – 3:46
 "So Beautiful" – 3:27

Credits and personnel
Vocals – Idina Menzel
Production: Jamey Jaz

References

Idina Menzel albums
2004 albums
Self-released albums